The parliamentary visitation of the University of Oxford was a political and religious purge taking place from 1647, for a number of years. Many Masters and Fellows of Colleges lost their positions.

Background
A comparable but less prominent parliamentary visitation of the University of Cambridge had taken place in 1644–5. The Siege of Oxford from 1644 to 1646 was one of the major military actions of the First English Civil War, given that the Royalist forces had their headquarters in Oxford city. The University of Oxford, broadly speaking, supported the Royalist side in the war, in particular in financial terms. The city surrendered to the parliamentary forces on 24 June 1646, and by 2 July parliament blocked new appointments in the university. By October a visitation was proposed, and an Oxford delegation made representations against it.

First moves
The initial step was the appointment of seven preachers of Presbyterian views, to bring in the use of the Directory for Public Worship. The visitation began on 15 May 1647. An early move was to summon Samuel Fell, the vice-chancellor. He ignored the visitors, was imprisoned for a time, and was deprived of his offices, by November.

The outbreak of the Second English Civil War in early 1648 prompted a much more effective approach from the visitors, who at first were quite successfully obstructed, and it was from April that the purge really began. All the members of the university Convocation were required to submit to the visitation, on 7 April 1648. Only one of the Heads of Houses, Paul Hood, did so at that point.

Formal structure
Formally, the visitation (which was the first out of three by 1660) was a commission of both houses of Parliament. It was controlled by a large parliamentary committee (the "London Committee"). To begin with, this consisted of 48 members of the House of Commons, tasked with the "reform" of the university. By the ordinance implemented 1 May 1647, it was replaced by 26 peers and 52 MPs. This group (and any five from them) were to oversee 26 Visitors. Of those, ten were Puritan clergy, who included the seven preachers sent to Oxford (in September). Those preachers comprised Francis Cheynell (who ran a "scruple shop"), Edward Corbet, Henry Cornish (then of St Giles in the Fields, after the visitation a canon of Christ Church), Robert Harris, Henry Langley, Edward Reynolds, and Henry Wilkinson.

In 1650 the London Committee was still transacting much of the business of the visitation. Francis Rous, initially appointed to the appeals committee, had by then assumed a leadership role. Staff on the ground in Oxford included Ralph Austen, who became registrar, and Elisha Coles who acted for him, both Calvinist writers. The Register was published in 1881, edited by Montagu Burrows.

Heads of Houses
The visitation had the power to order "intrusions": the Oxford colleges were self-governing institutions under a Master (i.e. "head of house", going under various other titles) and fellows, but the normal procedures for election were bypassed, if necessary, to impose appointments.

Christopher Hill distinguishes between the reactions of colleges and halls. Members of halls acknowledged the visitation; while the majority of college fellows were expelled for failing to do so.

Colleges

Halls

Professors

Dissolution of the initial visitation
The visitation, called later the "first", was brought to a close on 21 April 1652. It was replaced by a commission of five: John Wilkins, who had married Robina Cromwell, sister of Oliver Cromwell, Jonathan Goddard (Magdalen), and Thomas Goodwin (Merton) from among the heads of houses, with Peter French of Christ Church and John Owen who had become vice-chancellor.

Notes

Political and cultural purges
1647 in England
History of the University of Oxford
17th century in Oxfordshire
Parliament of England